San Román is a province in the Puno Region of Peru. It borders the provinces of Lampa, Azángaro, Puno, Huancane, the Arequipa Province of the Arequipa Region and Moquegua Region's province of General Sánchez Cerro. Its capital is the city of Juliaca.

Political division
The province is divided into four districts (Spanish: distritos, singular: distrito):
 Cabana
 Cabanillas 
 Caracoto
 Juliaca

Ethnic groups 
The province is inhabited by indigenous citizens of Aymara and Quechua descent. Spanish is the language which the majority of the population (61.52%) learnt to speak in childhood, 29.80% of the residents started speaking using the Quechua language and 8.53% using Aymara (2007 Peru Census).

See also 
 Intikancha
 Saraqucha
 Sayt'uqucha

Sources

External links
  Official provincial website

Provinces of the Puno Region